The Rising of the Shield Hero is a Japanese light novel series written by Aneko Yusagi. Originally published as a web novel, the series has since been published by Media Factory with an expanded story-line featuring illustrations by Seira Minami. As of June 25, 2019, twenty-two volumes have been published. The novel series was adapted into a manga series by Aiya Kyū and published by Media Factory, with twenty-two volumes released as of December 22, 2022. Both the novel and manga series were licensed by One Peace Books and were published in North America starting with the first volume on September 15, 2015. One Peace Books licensed the spin-off novel The Reprise of the Spear Hero.


Light novel

The Rising of the Shield Hero

Limited Edition The Rising of the Shield Hero Season 1 Light Novel

Originally released as 4 separate volumes with the Japanese Special Editions of the Season 1 anime.

The Reprise of the Spear Hero

Manga

The Rising of the Shield Hero

Chapters not yet in tankōbon format

The Reprise of the Spear Hero

Tate no Yūsha no to aru Ichi Nichi

Tate no Yūsha no Oshinagaki

References

External links

 
 

Rising of the Shield Hero, The
Rising of the Shield Hero, The